Plamen Bratoychev (born 17 October 1966) is a Bulgarian weightlifter. He competed at the 1992 Summer Olympics and the 1996 Summer Olympics.

References

1966 births
Living people
Bulgarian male weightlifters
Olympic weightlifters of Bulgaria
Weightlifters at the 1992 Summer Olympics
Weightlifters at the 1996 Summer Olympics
People from Knezha
World Weightlifting Championships medalists